General elections were held in the Solomon Islands on 4 August 2010. The election date was announced in May 2010 by Prime Minister Derek Sikua. Although the announcement was deemed to be premature, as only the Governor General has the authority to announce the election date upon the advice of the Electoral Commission, the election date remained the same.

Candidates
There were a total of 509 candidates, including 25 women.

Results
The event was overseen by international election observers connected with the United Nations International Election Observation Coordination Team.  The elections were described as peaceful, although strong concerns were expressed about voter registration irregularities.

25 incumbents were returned and 25 were replaced (including three seats where the incumbent chose not to recontest and one seat that was vacant due to the death of Edward Huni'ehu). Of the 50 MPs, most are relatively inexperienced: 45 have served less than two terms in office. The five long-serving MPs are Job Dudley Tausinga (entering his 7th consecutive term), Danny Philip (5th term), Snyder Rini (4th term), Manasseh Sogavare (4th term) and Gordon Darcy Lilo (3rd term).

By constituency
Incumbent members are marked with an asterisk.

Aftermath
On 11 August 2009, lobbying was reportedly in progress, as several political groups jockeyed to form a coalition government, with three main camps forming.

The first camp was built around the outgoing government led by Derek Sikua. One of its spokespeople, Matthew Wale, claimed on 13 August that the group has the support of five parties and 30 MPs including the Solomon Islands Democratic Party (12 MPs), the Solomon Islands Party for Rural Advancement (4), the Solomon Islands Liberal Party (1), the People's Congress Party (1), and six independents. This camp was based at the Heritage Hotel.

A second camp was based around three parties: the Ownership, Unity and Responsibility Party led by former Prime Minister Manasseh Sogavare (4 seats); the Direct Development Party led by Dick Ha'amori (3); and the Reform Democratic Party led by former Deputy Prime Minister Danny Philip (2). This camp was based at the Pacific Casino Hotel.

A third camp was led by the newly established Independent Democratic Party (IDP) led by Snyder Rini, and was based at Honiara Hotel. The IDP's party secretary Leonard Kaitu'u explained that the IDP was the successor to a previous party, the Association of Independent Members. Kaitu'u has suggested that their camp will also get support from the People's Alliance Party (PAP) and the Solomon Islands Party for Rural Advancement (SIPRA). It was thought possible that SIPRA would decide to join with the Heritage Hotel camp. A spokesman for the group denied that cash incentives were being used to secure members for the coalition.

Danny Philip was narrowly elected the Prime Minister on 24 August 2010, with 26 votes to 23 for his rival, the Democratic Party's Steve Abana.

In a victory speech following the Prime Ministerial election, Philip stated that his first priority would be to form a new government. He said his government would actively support the country's Constitutional Reform process. This had been one of his central campaign pledges, and the reason why he had formed the Reform Democratic Party.

Upon naming his cabinet, he appointed Manasseh Maelanga as his deputy.

References

Solomon Islands
Elections in the Solomon Islands
2010 in the Solomon Islands